Governor Thomas Johnson High School (GTJHS) is a four-year public high school in Frederick, Maryland, United States. The school is home to the Academy of Fine Arts, an auditioned-only visual and performing arts program for talented students in Frederick County from Grades 9th to 12th. The school is also home to the naval Junior Reserve Officers' Training Corps for Frederick County.

Thomas Johnson 

The school is named after former Maryland Governor Thomas Johnson who was the first post-colonial governor of the state.  He was also a delegate to the Continental Congress and an associate justice of the Supreme Court. Johnson himself received no formal education and taught himself the law while working for an attorney and qualified at age 28.

Buildings 
The school is located on Maryland Route 355, north of 14th Street, and southeast of U.S. Route 15. 
The address is 1501 N. Market Street in Frederick, MD 21701.

Students 
Gov. Thomas Johnson High has around 1,850 students and the demographics are as follows for 2021-2022 year 

30.5% White

23.7% African American
 
35.1% Hispanic

4.7% Multiracial

Thomas Johnson's graduation rate has been steadily rising over the past 12 years. In 2007 the school graduated 93.85%, the highest rate in the past 12 years and The school had a low of 84.91% in 1999.

The school's population had been steadily rising over the years, but has been decreasing over the last 4 years due to the redistricting of some students to Oakdale High School.

Academies 
Governor Thomas Johnson High School is home to 2 "academies" for Frederick County Public Schools.

The "Academy for the Fine Arts" has been at GTJHS since the late 1980s. AFA, as it is called, offers various college level classes pertaining to the arts for students in 10th, 11th, and 12th grade.

The Naval Junior Reserve Officers' Training Corps was a new addition to GTJHS for the 2015–16 school year. The program had previously been held at Linganore High School. The NJROTC features an orienteering team, a rifle team, and a drill team.

Sports 

State Champions

 2017 - Unified track 
 2013 - Boys' cross country
 2012 - Boys' indoor track & field
 2011 - Boys' outdoor track & field
 2010 - Boys' outdoor track & field
 2010 - Boys' indoor track & field
 2009 - Boys' outdoor track & field
 2009 - Boys' indoor track & field
 2006 - Boys' soccer 
 2002 - Baseball 
 2001 - Girls' soccer 
 2000 - Boys' track & field 
 1999 - Boys' basketball 
 1997 - Boys' basketball
 1997 - Girls' soccer
 1994 - Softball 
 1992 - Baseball
 1989 - Girls' basketball 
 1988 - Boys' basketball
 1986 - Boys' basketball
 1985 - Boys' basketball
 1983 - Baseball
 1983 - Girls' basketball
 1982 - Boys' basketball
 1982 - Football 
 1975 - Boys' basketball

Notable alumni
Virginia Cha, anchor on MSNBC Live, reporter for CNN
Nate Hairston, cornerback for the New York Jets
Branden Kline, Major League Baseball player for the Baltimore Orioles
Julia Martz-Fisher, Associate Judge for the Circuit Court for Frederick County.
Terence Morris, former NBA and Israel Basketball Premier League basketball player
Bryan Voltaggio, chef, Top Chef runner-up

See also 
List of high schools in Maryland
Frederick County Public Schools

References and notes

External links

Governor Thomas Johnson High School website

Educational institutions established in 1966
Public high schools in Maryland
Schools in Frederick County, Maryland
1966 establishments in Maryland
Buildings and structures in Frederick, Maryland
Education in Frederick, Maryland